The second generation Pontiac Firebird was introduced in early 1970 by Pontiac for the 1970 model year.

Overview
The second-generation debut for the 1970 model year was delayed until February 26, 1970, because of tooling and engineering problems; thus, its popular designation as a 1970½ model, while leftover 1969s were listed in early Pontiac literature without a model-year identification. This generation of Firebirds were available in coupe form only; after the 1969 model year, convertibles were not available until 1989.

Replacing the "Coke bottle" styling was a more "swoopy" body style, while still retaining some traditional elements. The top of the rear window line went almost straight down to the lip of the trunk lid. The new design was initially characterized by a large B-pillar, until 1975 when the rear window was enlarged. Originally, the "wraparound" style window that occupied more of the b-pillar was initially supposed to be the deisgn, but problems with the glue and sealing the rear window led to the flat style window being used until the re-designed body in 1975. This style became the look that was to epitomize the F-body styling for the longest period during the Firebird's lifetime.

Models
Firebird
Firebird Esprit
Firebird Formula
Firebird Trans Am

Special/Limited Editions and appearance packages
Formula appearance package (RPO W50, 1976–1981)
50th Anniversary limited edition (2,590 units, RPO Y82, 1976)
Special Edition appearance package, black with gold pinstriping (RPO Y82 1977–1978, RPO Y84 1978–1981)
Sky Bird Esprit appearance package (RPO W60, 1977–1978)
Red Bird Esprit appearance package (RPO W68, 1978–1979)
Yellow Bird Esprit appearance package (RPO W73, 1980)
Special Edition appearance package, gold with brown pinstriping (8,666 units, RPO Y88, 1978)
10th Anniversary Trans Am (TATA) limited edition (7,500 units, RPO Y89, 1979)
Turbo Trans Am Indianapolis pace car limited edition (5,700 units, RPO Y85, 1980)
Turbo Trans Am "Daytona 500" pace car limited edition (2,000 units, RPO Y85, 1981)
Macho Trans Am (offered by the Mecham Pontiac dealership in Glendale, AZ) (~400 units, 1977-1980).
Fire Am (Firebird American) offered by Herb Adams/VSE (~200 units, 1976-1981)

1970
The first year of the second generation Firebird began offering a wider array of model subtypes and marked the appearance of the Firebird Esprit, and the Firebird Formula. The Firebird Esprit was offered as a luxury model that came with appearance options, the deluxe interior package, and a Pontiac 350 as standard equipment. The Formula was advertised as an alternative to the Trans Am and could be ordered with all the options available to the Trans Am with the exception of the fender flares, shaker scoop, and fender heat extractors.

The base model Firebird came equipped with a   inline-six. The Esprit could be upgraded to a two barrel carbureted , while the Formula could be optioned to receive the L78 4 barrel 400 that produced  or the L74 Ram Air III 400 .

There were two Ram Air  engines available for the 1970 Trans Am: the  L74 Ram Air III 400 ( in the GTO) and the  L67 Ram Air IV ( in the GTO) that were carried over from 1969. The Ram Air IV was exclusive to the Trans Am, and could not be ordered on any of the lower Firebird models. The difference between the GTO and Firebird engines was that the secondary carburetor's throttle linkage had a restrictor which prevented the rear barrels from opening completely, adjusting the linkage could allow full carburetor operation resulting in identical engine performance.

For the 1970 and 1971 model years, all Firebirds equipped with radios had the antennae mounted "in-glass" in the windshield.

1971

The 1971 model year had a few minor changes to the Firebird. Fenders across all models now featured a one-year-only exhaust vent seen on the lower half of the fenders. The interior options also changed to the newer style collared bucket seats in the deluxe interior, and the previous year's seats with the headrest were no longer available. The rear seat console was introduced as an option, and Honeycomb wheels became available for all Firebirds.

1971 saw changes to the way the engines were rated from the factory. GM mandated that engines no longer use SAE Gross horsepower ratings and use the SAE Net power ratings to help alleviate the rising cost of insurance for performance vehicles. The compression ratio was also lowered for some of the models, de-tuning the power rating for some of the engines as part of new requirements for low-leaded fuels, however, the engine options remained mostly unchanged from 1970. As the limit for the compression ratio was lowered, this allowed for larger displacement engines to become available. The 455 was now available for the Firebird in two configurations. The 455 engine was available in the L75  version and the LS5  HO version. Both the 455 and 455 HO were available as engine options for the Firebird Formula, but the Trans Am received the 455 HO as standard equipment.

1972
During a 1972 strike, the Firebird (and the similar F-body Camaro) were nearly dropped.

The 1972 model year saw minor changes. A difference that differentiates a 1972 Firebird from the other 1970-73 Firebirds is the hexagonal honeycomb grille insert on the nose of the vehicle.

Engine options remained mostly unchanged, however, the L75 455 engine was dropped, but the LS5 455 HO remained as an option for the Formula and standard for the Trans Am. Pontiac advertised the 1972 455 HO as de-tuned to 300 hp, but the engine was unchanged from 1971.

Starting in 1972, and continuing until 1977, the Firebird was only produced at the Norwood, Ohio, facility.

1973
In 1973, the Trans Am added two new colors, Buccaneer Red and Brewster Green. Other exterior upgrades included the updated more modern nose bird. The new hood bird was option “RPO WW7 Hood Decal”, a $55 option exclusive to Trans Am.  The “Trans Am” decals were larger than previous versions and shared the same accent color schemes as the hood bird.

Inside the 1973, Firebird the standard interior equipment was almost the same as prior years. The new “Horse Collar” optional custom interior featured new seat coverings and door panels. The 1973 Firebird also had to meet the new safety and emissions requirements for 1973. There were extra steel reinforcements in the bumper and core support to the fender.

The 1973 Trans Am engine displaced 455 cubic inches in the base L75 and the Super Duty LS2 option. The base 455 produced 40 fewer horsepower than the round port Super Duty 455. Horsepower for the base L75 455 was rated at 250@4000 rpm and 370 lb/ft @2800 rpm. Pontiac removed the H.O. designation from the base engine, and simply decaled the now non-functioning shaker with “455”.

The “all hand-assembled” LS2 SD455 engine was rated at 290@4000 rpm and 395 lb/ft @3600 rpm. All Pontiac engines included a new EGR system, which delayed the SD-455 program until late into the production year. The shaker decal on the scoop read "SD-455".

The 1973 Trans Am introduced "Radial Tuned Suspension". When ordered, it included 15-inch radial tires. This delivered a more comfortable ride while also providing better cornering.

The 1973 Trans Am production was up over previous years, the L75 455 production was 3,130 with automatic and 1,420  with manual transmission. The special ordered $550 Option LS2 SD-455 production saw 180 automatics and 72 manuals.

1974

The 1974 models featured a redesigned "shovel-nose" front end and new wide "slotted" taillights. The 400, 455, and SD-455 engines were offered in the Trans Am and Formula models during 1974. A June 1974 test of a newly delivered, privately owned SD-455 Trans Am. This appeared in Super Stock and Drag Illustrated. With an unmodified car and a test weight of 4,010 lbs the testers clocked 14.25 seconds at 101 mph. The car had an automatic and A/C. Also, the factory rating of 290 hp was listed at 4,400 rpm while the factory tachometer has a 5,750 rpm redline. A production line stock 1974 SD455 produced 253 rear wheel HP on a chassis dyno, as reported by High Performance Pontiac magazine (January 2007). This is also consistent with the 290 SAE net horsepower factory rating (as measured at the crankshaft).

A 1974 Firebird was driven by Jim Rockford in the pilot movie and the first season (1974–1975) of The Rockford Files; every following season, Rockford would change to the next model year. However, in the sixth season (1979–1980), Rockford continued to drive the 1978 Firebird from season five, as the star, James Garner, disliked the 1979 model's restyled front end. The cars in the show were badged as lower-tier Esprit models but were Formulas with the twin-scoop hood replaced with a scoopless one. Another hint was the twin exhausts and rear anti-roll bars that were not used on the Esprit.

1975
The 1975 models featured new wraparound rear windows that curved out to occupy more of the B-Pillars, but the rear body shape and bumper remained unchanged. The turn signals were moved up from the valance panel to the grills which helped distinguish the 1975 from the 1974 front end as they are otherwise similar. This was also the last year of the larger profile larger snout Formula hood for the Firebird Formula.

The Super Duty engine and TurboHydramatic 400 three-speed automatic were no longer available in 1975. Due to the use of catalytic converters starting in 1975, the TH400 would not fit alongside the catalytic converter underneath the vehicle. The smaller TurboHydramatic 350 automatic was deemed suitable as the power output for the engine had significantly decreased from the earlier years. TH350 drew less power and also did not require an electronic kickdown system. The Pontiac L78 400 was standard in the Trans Am and the 455 was optional for both 1975 and 1976 models.

1975 also saw the start of the "500577" cast 400 engine blocks enter production. The 500577 cast blocks were considered a weaker cast, as they had a lower nickel content, had metal shaved off in the lower journals of the block to decrease the overall weight, cost, and emissions to meet the tightening smog restrictions. These blocks were used until the W72 engine reverted to the original specifications from the start of the decade with the 481988 cast in late 1977.

Originally, the L75 455 7.5L V8 was dropped entirely, but it returned mid-year, available only with a four-speed Borg Warner Super T-10, and it was no longer available for the Formula. Although it was brought back as the "455 HO", it was not the same engine as the 1971-72 LS2 455 HO seen in the earlier Firebirds. It was a standard D-port engine with a low profile camshaft and restrictive exhaust system that was also seen in the larger body Pontiac platforms. Power output was restricted to 200 HP with a torque rating of 330 lb⋅ft at 2,000 rpm. It was the largest displacement "performance" engine still available. Track testing in 1975 showed the 455 capable of 16.12 second quarter-mile time, which was similar to the L82 Corvette.

1976

Pontiac celebrated its 50th anniversary year in 1976. To commemorate this event, Pontiac unveiled a special Trans Am option at the 1976 Chicago Auto Show. Painted in black with gold accents, this was the first "anniversary" Trans Am package and the first production black and gold special edition. A removable T-top developed by Hurst was set to be included on all Y82 LE T/As, but proved problematic in installation and quality control, leading some Y82s to not be delivered with the Hurst T-top roof. All Hurst T-top equipped cars were built at the Norwood, Ohio, factory. It became an available option for other Firebirds in 1977.

1976 marked the end of the Pontiac L75 7.5 liter 455 V8, as it could no longer meet the tightening emissions restrictions and the "HO" moniker used the year prior was dropped. The L75 was only available with a four-speed manual Borg Warner Super T-10, and was exclusive to the Trans Am.

1976 also introduced the "W50 appearance package" for the Formula model line, consisting of a two-tone appearance package with lower accents across the bottom of the body, a large "Formula" decal across the bottom of each door, and a "Firebird" decal on the rear spoiler.

1977

The 1977 Firebird received a facelift that featured four rectangular headlamps. The shaker scoop was also revised for this year, with the early 1977-built T/As coming with off-center, lower-profile shaker scoops. The Formula hood was changed for the last time for the second generation with a much lower profile. The snowflake wheel became an option for all Firebirds and was standard with the Y82 appearance package, although it could be replaced with Rally II wheels as a credit option.

For the Esprit, an optional appearance package RPO W60 called the "Skybird appearance package" became available, featuring an all blue exterior and interior. This package was originally slated to be called the "Bluebird" similar to the "Yellowbird" and "Redbird" packages to follow in the upcoming model years, but the name was already in use for a company that produced school buses.

In 1977, General Motors began to source a larger selection of V8 engines to supply in the lower model Firebirds, and the Oldsmobile 350/403 V8, as well as the Chevrolet 305/350 V8, became options for the Firebird, Esprit, and Formula after June 1977. Previously, the Chevrolet inline-six was the only outsourced engine in a Firebird. Pontiac made the 301 (4.9 L) V8 available for order in the lower Firebird models, but due to such high demand and popularity, they removed it's availability from the Firebird model to allow enough 301 engines for the other Pontiac lines. It was re-introduced as an option in 1979 as production for the 400 ceased and tooling was converted over to the 301.

The Trans Am had now three different engine options, the standard Pontiac L78 400, the optional extra cost Pontiac W72 400, and the Oldsmobile-sourced L80 403. 1977 also saw the cubic inch metrics on the shaker dropped in favor of the displacement of the cylinders. The shakers had a "6.6 Litre" decal for all L78 Pontiac 400 and L80 Oldsmobile 403 engines. Only the optional W72 Pontiac 400 received the "T/A 6.6" decal.

The T/A 6.6 equipped engines had chrome valve covers, while the base 400 engines had painted valve covers. For 1977, the W72 shared the same air cleaner and shared the same 500577 cast block as the L78, but received the 6x4 heads, whereas the L78 only received the 6x8 heads. The 6x4 heads were used on early Pontiac 350 blocks that helped increase the compression, and also had hardened valve seats for a higher RPM operating range.

The Oldsmobile 403 was implemented as the 400 Pontiac could not satisfy emissions requirements for high-altitude states and California. Wanting to still offer a 6.6 litre option for the Trans Am, the 403 Olds was seen as a suitable replacement as when equipped with an A.I.R emissions system, it could satisfy the emissions criteria for these states and still offer the power ratings expected of the Trans Am. The L80 Oldsmobile 403 V8 had slightly more power than the standard L78 Pontiac 400 at 185 hp (138 kW) and offered the same low-end torque of 320 lb⋅ft (430 N⋅m) at a more useable operating range of 2,200rpm.

From 1977 to 1981, the Firebird used four square headlamps, while the Camaro continued to retain the two round headlights that had been shared by both second-generation designs. The 1977 Trans-Am special edition became famous after being featured in Smokey and the Bandit. The 1980 turbo model was used for Smokey and the Bandit II.

1978

Changes for 1978 were slight, with a switch from a honeycomb to a crosshatch pattern grille being the most notable change to the body style. The decals for the standard Trans Ams changed from the "looping style" lettering to the "block-style" font that would remain on the Firebird until the end of the second generation. T-tops in 1978 transitioned from Hurst units to Fisher (GM) in mid-year. Pontiac also introduced the Red Bird package on the Firebird Esprit model. Painted in Roman red with a matching deluxe red interior, it demonstrated gold accents with a unique Red Bird graphic on the b-pillars. It also included a Formula steering wheel with gold spokes and gold dash bezel, similar to the ones included in the Special Edition package, however, the red and gold steering wheel was exclusive to the Red Bird Esprit.

The W72 engine option also saw a revision to the camshaft duration and the tuning of the Rochester Quadrajet which lead to a 10% increase of horsepower from the following year, bringing the total to 220 hp. Additionally, the earlier stronger and more durable 481988 cast block returned on the W72, denoted with a large "XX" cast protruding off the side of the block near the cast code. The WS6 special performance package developed by Herb Adams was introduced as a handling option for the Trans Am, including a larger diameter rear sway bar, tighter ratio steering box, 15x8-inch snowflake wheels, additional frame bracing, as well as other suspension changes. Delays in manufacturing prevented the rear disc brake (RPO J65) from being available on the 1978 model year. Approximately 23.1% (28,239) of Formulas and Trans Ams in 1978 had the WS6 option according to Pontiac sales information at the start of 1979. At the end of 1978, the WS6 handling package became available for the Formula models as well.

1979

The front end was restyled for 1979, which also marked the 10th anniversary of the Trans Am. For 1979, there were three possible engine options. The L80 Oldsmobile 403ci engine became the standard and was only available with the TH350 3-speed automatic. The W72 was available for a short period and in limited supply. This was the last of the line for the Pontiac large displacement V8 engines, and only available with the Borg-Warner Super T-10, also requiring the WS6 handling package as mandatory equipment in conjunction with this driveline choice. A credit option with a four-speed transmission was the smaller displacement Pontiac L37 301 4.9 liter V8 and it came with either the ST-10 or TH350.

A limited-edition anniversary package was made available: platinum silver paint with charcoal gray upper paint accents and mirrored T-tops, and a special interior featuring silver leather seats with custom-embroidered Firebird emblems and aircraft-inspired red lighting for the gauges. The 10th-anniversary cars also featured special 10th-anniversary decals, including a Firebird hood decal that extended off of the hood and onto the front fenders. Pontiac produced 7,500 10th anniversary cars, of which 1,817 were equipped with the high-output Pontiac T/A 6.6 W72 400 engine. Two 10th anniversary Trans Ams were the actual pace cars for the 1979 Daytona 500, which has been called the race that made NASCAR. Car and Driver magazine named the Trans Am with the WS6 performance package the best handling car of 1979. During period dyno testing, the National Hot Rod Association rated the limited-availability T/A 6.6 high-output Pontiac 400 engine at 260–280 net horsepower, which was significantly higher than Pontiac's conservative rating of 220 hp. In 1979 Pontiac sold 116,535 Trans Ams, the highest sold in a year.

1980
In 1980, ever-increasing emissions restrictions led Pontiac to drop all of its large-displacement engines. 1980 therefore saw the biggest engine changes for the Trans Am. The 301, offered in 1979 as a credit option, was now the standard engine. No manual transmission was available for the Formula or Trans Am in 1980, all received the 3-speed automatic Turbo Hydramatic 350. Engine options included a turbocharged 301 or the Chevrolet 305 small block. The turbocharged 301 used a Garrett TB305 turbo attached to a single Rochester Quadrajet four-barrel carburetor and featured a hood-mounted "boost" gauge that would light up as the TB305 accumulated boost. The hood of the 301T equipped Firebirds had a large offset bulge to accommodate for the mounting position of the carburetor on the engine as the turbocharger exhaust occupied a large amount of space in the engine bay. The 301T equipped T/A's were restricted to an automatic transmission and a 3.08 rear differential ratio.

A 1980 turbo Trans Am was featured in the movie Smokey and the Bandit II, but was fitted with nitrous oxide tanks by Marvin Miller Systems to get the desired performance.

1981

1981 became the final year for the second generation Pontiac Firebird. The three engine options were unchanged for the model line-up, however, the option for a four-speed Borg Warner Super T-10 was re-introduced for the Formula and Trans Am, but was only available with the Chevrolet sourced LG4 305 5.0 liter V8. As with all other General Motors vehicles for 1981, all engines came equipped with the "computer command control" system attached to the carburetor.

The hood decal for the 1981 model year was also slightly restyled. All Firebirds also received an embossed silver Firebird decal on the petrol tank cap attached to the rear taillights. On the special edition Trans Ams, this Firebird was gold.

The G80 limited-slip differential that was previously standard for the last decade on all Trans Ams became a pay-extra option. This decision was made by Pontiac to prepare dealers for the new ordering and pricing for the third generation Firebird where the G80 was no longer being included as a standard option for the Trans Am.

Engines

Production totals

Notes

References

Firebird (1970-1981)
Cars introduced in 1970
1970s cars
1980s cars
Cars discontinued in 1981